The Bell Bridge, crossing the Niobrara River near Valentine, Nebraska, is a historic bridge that is listed on the National Register of Historic Places.

It is a Pratt through truss bridge that was designed by the Canton Bridge Co. of Canton, Ohio, fabricated by the Cambria Steel Co. of Johnstown, Pennsylvania, and built by the Canton Bridge Co.  It was built in 1903 and brings a Cherry County road across the Niobrara, 11.9 miles northeast of Valentine.  It has also been known as the Allen Bridge and the Niobrara River Bridge and is registered as NEHBS No. CE00-22.

It is one of just four bridges in Cherry County that survived a flood in February, 1916.  According to its NRHP nomination it is notable as "one of the oldest, longest and best-preserved of Cherry County's remarkable group of through trusses" and is "distinguished as one of the handful of pre-1916 trusses remaining" in the county and in the state.

National Register designation was given in 1992.

References

External links 
More photos of the Bell Bridge at Wikimedia Commons

Road bridges on the National Register of Historic Places in Nebraska
Bridges completed in 1903
Bridges in Cherry County, Nebraska
National Register of Historic Places in Cherry County, Nebraska
Steel bridges in the United States